This is an incomplete list of selected academic publications by Milan Zeleny, sorted by different disciplines and research areas.

Articles

Pre-exile work until 1967 
 Analysis of Complex Projects by Critical Path Method (Analýza složitých procesů metodou kritické cesty), Ekonomicko-matematická laboratoř při EÚ ČSAV, Výzkumná publikace č. 4, Praha, 1964, p. 130.
 "Network Analysis Techniques (CPM, PERT)" (Metody analýzy sítí (CPM, PERT)), Ekonomicko-matematický obzor, 1(1965) 3, pp. 225–262.
 “The Multidimensional Model of Complex Technological Projects” (Vícerozměrný model složitých technicko-ekonomických procesů (VRM-step)), Pozemní stavby, 13(1965), pp. 351–4. (With P. Bezděk)
 “Scientific Management of Complex Systems" (Vědecké řízení složitých soustav), Věda a život, č. 1-2 (1965), pp. 705– 709.
 "Optimal Balancing of Production Lines" (Metody optimálního vyvažování výrobních linek), Podniková Organizace, 20(1966)19, pp. 456– 458.
 American Specialists on Critical Path (Američtí specialisté o kritické cestě), Ekonomicko-matematická laboratoř při EÚ ČSAV, Informační publikace č. 25, Praha, 1966, p. 88.
 "Network Analysis by Dynamic Programming Technique" (Analýza sítě technikou dynamického programování), Ekonomicko–matematický obzor, 3(1967) 1, pp. 63–74.
 "A Markovian Approach to Network Analysis Methods-MANAM” (Markovský přístup k řešení problémů analýzy sítě), Ekonomicko–matematický obzor, 3(1967)2, pp. 214–259.

Optimization 
 Linear Multiobjective Programming, Springer-Verlag, New York, 1974, p. 220.
 "The Techniques of Linear Multiobjective Programming," Revue Française d'Automatique, d'Informatique et de Recherche Operationelle, 8(1974) V-3, pp. 51–71. (With P. L. Yu)
 "The Set of All Nondominated Solutions in Linear Cases and A Multicriteria Simplex Method," Journal of Mathematical Analysis and Applications, 49(1975) 2, pp. 430–468. (With P. L. Yu)
 "Ellipsoid Algorithms in Mathematical Programming," Human Systems Management, 1(1980) 2, pp. 173–178.
 "The Pros and Cons of Goal Programming," Computers and Operations Research, 8(1981)4, pp. 357–359.
 "An External Reconstruction Approach (ERA) to Linear Programming," Computers and Operations Research, 13(1986) 1, pp. 95–100.
 "Optimal System Design: Towards New Interpretation of Shadow Prices in Linear Programming," Computers and Operations Research, 14(1987) 4, pp. 265–271. (With M. Hessel)
 "Fuzziness, Knowledge, and Optimization: New Optimality Concepts," in: Fuzzy Optimization: Recent Advances, edited by M. Delgado, J. Kacprzyk, J.-L. Verdegay and M.A. Vila, Physica-Verlag, Heidelberg, 1994, pp. 3–20.
 "Rethinking Optimality: Eight Concepts," Human Systems Management, 15(1996)1, pp. 1–4.
 "Eight Concepts of Optimality," in: Multicriteria Analysis, edited by J. Climaco, Springer-Verlag, Berlin, 1997, pp. 191–200.
 "From Maximization to Optimization: MCDM and the Eight Models of Optimality," in: Essays  in Decision Making, edited by M. H. Karwan, J. Spronk and J. Wallenius, Springer-Verlag, 1997, pp. 107–119.

Multiple Criteria Decision Making 
 Multiple Criteria Decision Making, University of South Carolina Press, Columbia, S. C., 1973, p. 816. (Editor with J. L. Cochrane)
 "A  Concept  of  Compromise  Solutions  and  the  Method  of  the  Displaced  Ideal," Computers and Operations Research, 1(1974) 4, pp. 479–496.
 Multiple Criteria Decision Making: Kyoto 1975, Springer-Verlag, New York, 1976, p. 340. (Editor)
 "Games with Multiple Payoffs," International Journal of Game Theory, 4(1976) 4, pp. 179–191.
 Multiple Criteria Decision Making, McGraw-Hill, New York, 1982.
 Multiple Criteria Decision Making: Selected Case Studies, McGraw-Hill, New York, 1982. (Editor with C. Carlsson and A. Torn)
 MCDM - Past Decade and Future Trends, A Source Book of Multiple Criteria Decision Making,  JAI Press, Greenwich, Conn., 1984. (Editor)
 "Introduction: Ten Years of MCDM," in: MCDM - Past Decade and Future Trends, A Source Book of Multiple Criteria Decision Making, edited by M. Zeleny, JAI Press, Greenwich, Conn., 1984, pp. ix-xiii. Also: "Multicriterion Design of High-Productivity Systems," pp. 169–187.
 "Multiple Criteria Decision Making (MCDM)," in: Encyclopedia of Statistical Sciences, vol. 5, John Wiley & Sons, New York, 1985, pp. 693–696.
 "Multicriteria Decision Making," in: Systems & Control Encyclopedia, Pergamon Press, Elmsford, N.Y., 1987, pp. 3116–3121.
 "Systems Approach to Multiple Criteria Decision Making: Metaoptimum," in: Toward Interactive and Intelligent Decision Support Systems, edited by Y. Sawaragi, K. Inoue and H. Nakayama, Springer-Verlag, New York, 1987, pp. 28–37.
 "Multicriteria Decision Making," in: Systems & Control Encyclopedia, Supplementary Volume 1, Pergamon Press, Elmsford, N.Y., 1990, pp. 431–437.
 "Gestalt System of Holistic Graphics: New Management Support View of MCDM," Computers and Operations Research, 18(1991) 2, pp. 233–239. (With E. Kasanen and R. Ostermark)
 "Cognitive Equilibrium," Ekonomicko-matematický obzor, 27(1991) 1, pp. 53–61
 "Measuring Criteria: Weights of Importance," Human Systems Management, 10(1991) 4, pp. 237–238.
 "An Essay into a Philosophy of MCDM: A Way of Thinking or Another Algorithm?" Invited Essay, Computers and Operations Research, 19(1992) 7, pp. 563–566.
 "The Ideal-Degradation Procedure: Searching  for Vector Equilibria," in: Advances In Multicriteria Analysis, edited by P.M. Pardalos, Y. Siskos, C. Zopounidis, Kluwer, 1995, pp. 117–127.
 "Tradeoffs-Free Management," in: The Art and Science of Decision-Making, edited by P. Walden et al., Abo University Press, Abo, 1996, pp. 276–283.
 "Towards the Tradeoffs-Free Optimality in MCDM," in: Multicriteria  Analysis, edited by J. Climaco, Springer-Verlag, Berlin, 1997, pp. 596–601.
 "Multiple Criteria Decision Making: Eight Concepts of Optimality," Human Systems Management, 17(1998)2, pp. 97–107.
 “The KM-MCDM interface in decision design: tradeoffs-free conflict dissolution“, Int. J. Applied Decision Sciences, 1(2008)1, pp. 3–23.¨
 “MCDM: From Paradigm Lost to Paradigm Regained?” J. of Multiple Criteria Decision Analysis, 2011
 “MCDM: In Search of New Paradigms...” in: The New State of MCDM in 21st Century, MCDM conference, Chengdu, June 22–26, 2009, Springer-Verlag, 2011.

Management Science 
 "Managers Without Management Science?" Interfaces, 5(1975) 4, pp. 35–42.
 "New Vistas of Management Science," Computers and Operations Research, 2(1975) 2, pp. 121–125.
 "The Attribute-Dynamic Attitude Model (ADAM)," Management Science, 25(1976) 1, pp. 12–26.
 "Linear Multiparametric Programming by Multicriteria Simplex Method," Management Science, 23(1976) 2, pp. 159–170. (With P. L. Yu)
 Multiple Criteria Decision Making, TIMS Studies in the Management Sciences, Vol. 6, North-Holland Publishing Co., Amsterdam, 1977, p. 270. (Editor with M.K. Starr)
 "The Last Mohicans of OR: Or, It Might Be in the 'Genes'," Interfaces, 9(1979) 5, pp. 135–141.
 "Descriptive Decision Making and Its Applications," in: Applications of Management Science, Vol. 1, edited by R.L. Schultz, JAI Press, Greenwich, Conn., 1981, pp. 327–388.
 "New Vistas in Management Science," in: Cases and Readings in Management Science, edited  by E.F. Turban  and P. Loomba, Business Publications, Plano, Texas,  1982,  pp. 319–325.
 "Work and Leisure," in: International Encyclopedia of Business & Management, Routledge, London, 1996, pp. 5082–8. Also: "Multiple Criteria Decision Making," pp. 978–90. "Critical Path Analysis (CPA)," pp. 904–9. "Optimality and Optimization," pp. 3767–80. "Bata-System of Management," pp. 351–4.
 Human Systems Management: Integrating Knowledge, Management and Systems, World Scientific, 2nd Printing 2008.
 “Strategy as Action: from Porter to Anti-Porter,” Int. J. Strategic Decision Sciences, 1(2010)1, pp. 1–22.

Psychology and Judgment 
 "On the Inadequacy of the Regression Paradigm Used in the Study of Human Judgment," Theory and Decision, 7(1976) 1/2, pp. 57–65.
 "Conflict Dissolution," General Systems Yearbook, XXI, 1976, pp. 131–136.
 "Intuition and Probability," The Wharton Magazine, 1(1977)4, pp. 63–68.
 "Intuition, Its Failures and Merits," in: Surviving Failures, edited by B. Persson, Humanities Press, Atlantic Highlands, N.J., 1979, pp. 172–183.
 "Cognitive Equilibrium: A New Paradigm of Decision Making?" Human Systems Management, 8(1989)3, pp. 185–188.
 "In Search of Cognitive Equilibrium: Beauty, Quality and Harmony," Multi-Criteria Decision Analysis, 3(1994), pp. 48.1-48.11.

Autopoiesis 
 "Simulation of Self-Renewing Systems," in: Evolution and Consciousness: Human Systems in Transition, edited by E. Jantsch and C. H. Waddington, Addison-Wesley, Reading, Ma., 1976, pp. 150–165. (With N.A. Pierre)
 "Self-Organization of Living Systems: A Formal Model of Autopoiesis," Int. J. General Systems, 4(1977) I, pp. 13–28.
 "APL-AUTOPOIESIS: Experiments in Self-Organization of Complexity," in: Progress in Cybernetics and Systems Research, vol. Ill, edited by R. Trappl et al., Hemisphere Publishing Corp., Washington, D.C., 1978, pp. 65–84.
 Autopoiesis, Dissipative Structures, and Spontaneous Social Orders, AAAS Selected Symposium 55, Westview Press, Boulder, Co., 1980. (Editor)
 "Autopoiesis: A Paradigm Lost?"  in: Autopoiesis, Dissipative Structures, and Spontaneous Social Orders, AAAS Selected Symposium 55, edited by M. Zeleny, Westview Press, Boulder, Co., 1980, pp. 3–43.
 "What  Is Autopoiesis?" in: Autopoiesis: A Theory of Living Organization, edited by M. Zeleny, Elsevier North Holland, New York, NY, 1981, pp. 4–17.
 "Autogenesis: On  the  Self-Organization of  Life,"  in:  Autopoiesis: A Theory of Living Organization, edited  by M. Zeleny, Elsevier  North  Holland,  New York,  NY, 1981, pp. 91–115.
 "Autopoiesis Today," in: Cybernetics Forum, Special Issue Devoted toAutopoiesis, edited by M. Zeleny, 10(1981) 2/3, Summer/Fall 1981, pp. 3–6. Also: "Self-Organization of Living Systems: A Formal Model of Autopoiesis," pp. 24–38.
 "Autopoiesis," in: Systems & Control Encyclopedia, Pergamon Press, Elmsford, N.Y., 1987, pp. 393–400.
 "Simulation Models of Autopoiesis: Variable Structure," in:  Systems & Control Encyclopedia, Pergamon Press, Elmsford, N.Y., 1987, pp. 4374–4377.
 "Simulation Models of Autopoiesis: Variable Structure," in: Systems & Control Encyclopedia, Supplementary Volume 1, Pergamon Press, Elmsford, N.Y., 1990, pp. 543–547.
 "All Autopoietic Systems Must Be Social Systems," Journal of Social and Biological Structures, 14(1991) 3, pp. 311–332. (With K. D. Hufford)
 "Are Biological Systems Social Systems?" Human Systems Management, 10(1991)2, pp. 79–81.
 "The Application of Autopoiesis in Systems Analysis: Are Autopoietic Systems Also Social Systems?" Int. J. General Systems, 21(1992) 2, pp. 145–160. (With K. D. Hufford)
 "The Ordering of the Unknown by Causing It to Order Itself," Int. J. General Systems, 21(1992) 2, pp. 239–253. (With K. D. Hufford)
 "On Social Nature of Autopoietic  Systems," in: Evolution, Order and Complexity, edited by E. L. Khalil and K. E. Boulding, Routledge,  London, 1996, pp. 122–145.
 "Autopoiesis and Self-Sustainability in Economic Systems," Human Systems Management, 16(1997)4, pp. 251–262.
 "Autopoiesis (Self-production) in SME Networks," Human Systems Management, 20(2001)3, pp. 201–207.
 “Autopoiesis”, in: International Encyclopedia of Organization Studies, edited by S. R. Clegg and J. R. Bailey, Sage Publications, 2007.

Spontaneous Social Orders 
 "Holistic Aspects of Biological and Social Organizations: Can They Be Studied?" in: Environment and Population: Problems of Adaptation, edited  by John B. Calhoun,  Praeger Publishers, New York, 1983, pp. 150–153.
 "Spontaneous Social Orders," in: The Science and Praxis of Complexity, The United Nations University, Tokyo, 1985, pp. 312–328.
 "Spontaneous Social Orders," Int. J. General Systems, 11(1985) 2, pp. 117–131.
 "Les orders sociaux spontanes," in: Science et pratique de la complexite, Actes du colloque de Montpellier, Mai 1984, IDATE/UNU, La Documentation Française, Paris, 1986, pp. 357–378.
 "La grande inversione: Corso e ricorso dei modi di vita umani," in: Physis: abitare la terra, edited by M. Ceruti and E. Laszlo, Feltrinelli, Milano, 1988, pp. 413–441.
 "Spontaneous Social Orders," in: A Science of Goal Formulation: American and Soviet Discussions of Cybernetics and Systems Theory, edited by S. A. Umpleby and V. N. Sadovsky, Hemisphere Publishing Corp., Washington, D.C., 1991, pp. 133–150.
 "Alia ricerca di un equilibrio cognitivo: bellezza, qualita e armonia," in:  Estimo ed economia ambientale: le nuove frontiere nel campo della valutazione, edited by L. Fusco Girard, Franco Angeli, Milano, 1993, pp. 113–131.
 "Ecosocieties: Societal Aspects of Biological Self-Production," Soziale Systeme, 1(1995)2, pp. 179–202.

Economics 
 Columbia Journal of World Business, Focus: Decision Making, XII (1977)3, p. 136. (Editor with M.K. Starr)
 "At the End of the Division of Labor," Human Systems Management, 6(1986) 2, pp. 97–99.
 "Beyond capitalism and socialism: Human manifesto," Human Systems Management, 7(1988) 3, pp. 185–188.
 "Moving from the Age of Specialization to the Era of Integration," Human Systems Management, 9(1990)3, pp. 153–171. (With R. Comet and J.A.F. Stoner)
 "Transition To Free Markets: The Dilemma of Being and Becoming," Human Systems Management, 10(1991) 1, pp. 1–5.
 "Privatization," Human Systems Management, 10(1991)3, pp. 161–163.
 "Reforms in Czechoslovakia: Tradition or Cosmopolitanism?" in: Management Reform in Eastern and Central Europe: Use of Pre-Communist Cultures, edited by M. Maruyama, Dartmouth Publishing Company (Dover), 1992, pp. 45–64.
 "Economics, Business and Culture," Human Systems Management, 12(1993)3, pp. 171–174.
 "Eastern Europe: Quo Vadis?" Human Systems Management, 12(1993)4, pp. 259–264.
 "Human and Social Capital: Prerequisites for Sustained Prosperity," Human Systems Management, 14(1995)4, pp. 279–282.
 "Asset Optimization and Multi-Resource Planning" Human Systems Management, 15(1996)3, pp. 153–155.
 "Ecosocieta: aspetti sociali dell'auto-produzione biologica," in: Teorie Evolutive e Transformazioni Economiche, edited by E. Benedetti, M. Mistri and S. Solari, CEDAMPadova, 1997, pp. 121–142.
 "The Decline of Forecasting?" Human Systems Management, 16(1997)1, pp. 1–3.
 "Insider Ownership and LBO Performance," Human Systems Management, 16(1997) 4, pp. 243–245.
 "National and Corporate Asset Optimization: From Macro- to Micro-Reengineering," in: Economic Transformation & Integration: Problems, Arguments, Proposals, edited by R. Kulikowski, Z. Nahorski and J. Owsinski, Systems Research Institute, Warsaw, 1998, pp. 103–118.
 "Beyond the Network Organization: Self-Sustainable Web Enterprises," in: Business Networks in Asia, edited by F.-J. Richter, Quorum Books, Westport, CT, 1999, pp. 269–285.
 "Strategy for Macro- and Micro-Reengineering in Knowledge-based Economies”  in: The Socio-Economic Transformation: Getting Closer to What?  edited by Z. Nahorski, J. Owsinski, and T. Szapiro, Macmillan, London, 1999, pp. 113–125.
 "Elimination of Tradeoffs in Modem Business and Economics," in: New Frontiers of Decision Making for the Information Technology Era, edited by M. Zeleny and Y. Shi, World Scientific Publishers, 2000.
 “Innovation Factory: Production of Value-Added Quality and Innovation,” Economics and Management, 9(2006)4, pp. 58–65.
 “On the Essential Multidimensionality of an Economic Problem: Towards Tradeoffs-Free Economics,” Czech Economic Review, 3(2009)2, pp. 154–175.
 “Invisible Hand of the Market,” in: Atlas of  Transformation, JRP Ringier, Zurich, 2010.
 “Ownership,” in: Atlas of Transformation, JRP Ringier, Zurich, 2010, pp.

Fuzzy Sets 
 "Membership Functions and Their Assessment," in: Current Topics in Cybernetics and Systems, edited by J. Rose, Springer-Verlag, Berlin, 1978, pp. 391–392.
 "Fuzzy  Sets:  Precision  and  Relevancy,"  in: Applied Systems and Cybernetics, Vol. 6, edited by G.E. Lasker, Pergamon Press, Elmsford, N.Y., 1981, pp. 2719–2721.
 "Qualitative versus Quantitative Modeling in Decision Making," Human Systems Management, 4(1983) 1, pp. 39–42.
 "On the (Ir) Relevancy of Fuzzy Sets Theories," Human Systems Management, 4(1984)4, pp. 301–306.
 "Parallelism, Integration, Autocoordination and Ambiguity in Human Support Systems," in: Fuzzy Logic in Knowledge-Based Systems, Decision and Control, edited by M.M. Gupta and T. Yamakawa,  North-Holland, New York, 1988, pp. 107–122.
 "The Role of Fuzziness in the Construction of Knowledge," in: The Interface Between Artificial Intelligence and Operations Research in Fuzzy Environment, eds. J.-L. Verdegay and M. Delgado, Interdisciplinary Systems Research Series no. 95, Verlag TDv Rheinland, 1989, pp. 233–252.
 "Cognitive Equilibrium: A Knowledge-Based Theory of Fuzziness and Fuzzy Sets," Int. J. General Systems, 19(1991) 4, pp. 359–381.
 "Fuzzifying the 'Precise' Is More Relevant Than Modeling the Fuzzy 'Crisply' (Rejoinder by M. Zeleny)," Int. J. General Systems, 19(1991)4, pp. 435–440.

Management 
 "Management of Human Systems & Human Management of Systems,“ Erhvervs økonomisk Tidsskrift, April 1986, pp. 107–116.
 "Management of Human Systems & Human Management of Systems," in: Trends and Megatrends in the Theory of Management, ed. E. Johnsen, Bratt International, Lund, 1986, pp. 35–44.
 "The Law of Requisite Variety: Is It Applicable to Human Systems?" Human Systems Management, 6(1986) 4, pp. 269–271.
 "On Human Systems Management: An Emerging Paradigm," Human Systems Management, 6(1986) 2, pp. 181–184.
 "Integrated Process Management: A Management Technology for the New Competitive Era," in: Global Competitiveness: Getting the U.S. Back on Track, edited by M.K. Starr, W.W. Norton & Co., New York, 1988, pp. 121–158. (With M. Hessel and M. Mooney)
 "Integrated Process Management: A Management Technology for the New Competitive Era," Part 1 (in Japanese, transl. Y. Kondo), Standardization and Quality Control, 42(1989)10, pp. 61–68. Part 2, 42(1989)11, pp. 78–85. (With M. Hessel and M. Mooney)
 "Management Wisdom of the West," Part 1 (in Japanese), Standardization and Quality Control, 43(1990) 11, pp. 41–48. Part 2, 43(1990) 12, pp. 43–48.
 "Osaka Lectures on IPM," (in Japanese, transl. Y. Kondo), Standardization and Quality Control, 42(1989) 12, pp. 75–82.
 "What Is Integrated Process Management?" Human Systems Management, 7(1988) 3, pp. 265–267.
 "Quality Management Systems: Subject to Continuous Improvement?" Human Systems Management, 8(1989)1, pp. 1–3.
 "Amoeba: The New Generation of Self-Managing Human Systems," Human Systems Management, 9(1990) 2, pp. 57–59.
 "Management Wisdom of the West," Human Systems Management, 9(1990) 2, 119-125.
 "Management Challenges in the 1990s," in: Managing Toward the Millennium, edited by J.E. Hennessy and S. Robins, Fordham University Press, New York, 1991, pp. 3–65. (With R. Comet and J.A.F. Stoner)
 "Towards Trade-Offs-Free Management," Human Systems Management, 13(1994)4, pp. 241–243.
 "Global Management Paradigm," Human Systems Management, 14(1995)3, pp. 191–194.
 "Customer-Specific Value Chain: Beyond Mass Customization?" Human Systems Management, 15(1996)2, pp. 93–97.
 "Comparative Management Systems: Trade-Offs-Free Concept," in: Dynamics of Japanese Organizations, edited by F.-J. Richter, Routledge, London, 1996, pp. 167–177.
 "The Fall of Strategic Planning," Human Systems Management, 16(1997)2, pp. 77–79.
 “Effective Strategic Action: Exploring Synergy Sources of European and Asian Management Systems,” (with M. Blahova), Human Systems Management, 32(2013)3.

Baťa System 
 "The Roots of Modem Management: Bat'a-System," Human Systems Management, 6(1986) 1, pp. 4–7.
 "The Root of Modern Management: Bat'a-System," (in Japanese, transl. Y.  Kondo) Standardization and Quality Control, 40(1987)1, pp. 50–53.
 "Three-Men Talk on Bat'a-System," (In Japanese) Standardization and Quality Control, 41(1988) 1, pp. 15–24.
 "Bat'a System of Management: Managerial Excellence Found," Human Systems Management, 7(1988) 3, pp. 213–219.
 "Bata, Thomas (1876-1932)," in: IEBM Handbook of Management Thinking, Thomson, London, 1997, pp. 49–52.
 “Bata Management System: A built-in resilience against crisis at the micro level,” Czech Economic Review, 4(2010)1, pp. 102–117.

Finance 
 "Multidimensional Measure of  Risk: Prospect Ranking  Vector (PRV)," in:  Multiple Criteria Problem Solving, edited  by S. Zionts, Springer-Verlag, New  York, 1978, pp. 529–548.
 Uncertain Prospects Ranking and  Portfolio Analysis Under the Conditions of Partial Information, Mathematical Systems in Economics 44, Oelschlager, Gunn & Hain Publishers, Cambridge, MA., 1979/1980. (With G. Colson)
 "Satisficing, Optimization and Risk in Portfolio Selection," in: Readings in Strategy for Corporate Investment, edited by F.G.J.  Derkinderen and R.L. Crum, Pitman Publishing, Boston, 1981, pp. 200–219.

History 
 B. Trentowski, Stosunek Filozofii do Cybernetyki czyli sztuki rzadzenia narodem; A.A. Bogdanov, Tektologia: vseobschaia organizatsionaia nauka; J.Ch. Smuts, Holism and Evolution; S. Leduc, The Mechanism of Life, Int. J.  General Systems, 5(1979) 1, pp. 63–71.
 "Cybernetics and General Systems- A Unitary Science?" Kybernetes, 8(1979) 1, pp. 17–23.
 "Cybernetyka," Int. J. General Systems, 13(1987) 3, pp. 289–294.
 "Tectology," Int. J. General Systems, 14(1988) 4, pp. 331–343.
 "Trentowski's Cybemetyka," in: Systems & Control Encyclopedia, Supplementary Volume 1, Pergamon Press, Elmsford, N.Y., 1990, pp. 587–589.
 “W. Edwards Deming,” in: The Oxford Handbook of Management Theorists, eds. M. Witzel and M.  Warner, Ch. 11, Oxford University Press, 2013, pp. 196–218.

Transformation 
 "The Self-Service Society: A New Scenario of the Future," Planning Review, 7(1979) 3, pp. 3–7, 37-38.
 "Towards a Self-Service Society," Human Systems Management, 1(1980) 1, pp. 1–3.
 "Socio-Economic Foundations of a Self-Service Society," in: Progress in Cybernetics and Systems Research, vol. 10, Hemisphere Publishing, Washington, D.C., 1982, pp. 127–132.
 "Self-Service Trends in the Society," in: Applied Systems and Cybernetics, Vol. 3, edited by G. E. Lasker, Pergamon Press, Elmsford, N.Y., 1981, pp. 1405–1411.
 "Self-Service Aspects of Health Maintenance: Assessment of Current Trends," Human Systems Management, 2(1981) 4, pp. 259–267. (With M. Kochen)
 "The Grand Reversal: On the Corso and Ricorso of Human Way of Life," World Futures, 27(1989), pp. 131–151.
 "Structural Recession in the U.S.A.," Human Systems Management, 11(1992)1, pp. 1–4.
 "Work and Leisure," in: IEBM Handbook on Human Resources Management, Thomson, London, 1997, pp. 333–339. Also: "Bata-System of Management," pp. 359–362.
 "Industrial Districts of Italy: Local-Network Economies in a Global-Market Web," Human Systems Management, 18(1999)2, pp. 65–68.
 “Machine/Organism Dichotomy of Free-Market Economics: Crisis or Transformation?” Human Systems Management, 29(2010)4, pp. 191–204.
 “Genesis of the Worldwide Crisis,” in: Atlas of Transformation, JRP Ringier, Zurich, 2010.
 “Crisis or Transformation: On the corso and ricorso of human systems,” Human Systems Management, 31(2012)1, pp. 49–63.

De Novo Programming 
 "On the Squandering of Resources and Profits via Linear Programming," Interfaces, 11(1981)5, pp. 101–107.
 "A Case Study in Multiobjective Design: De Novo Programming," in: Multiple Criteria Analysis: Operational Methods, edited by P. Nijkamp  and J. Spronk,  Gower Publishing, Hampshire, 1981, pp. 37–52.
 "Multicriterion Design of High-Productivity Systems: Extensions and Applications," in: Decision Making with Multiple Objectives, edited by Y.Y. Haimes and V. Chankong, Springer-Verlag, New York, 1985, pp. 308–321.
 "Optimal System Design with Multiple Criteria: De Novo Programming Approach," Engineering Costs and Production Economics, 10(1986), pp. 89–94.
 "Optimizing Given Systems vs. Designing Optimal Systems: The De Novo Programming Approach," Int. J. General Systems, 17(1990) 4, pp. 295–307.
 "De Novo Programming," Ekonomicko-matematický obzor, 26(1990) 4, pp. 406–413.
 "Trade-Offs-Free Management via De Novo Programming," International Journal of Operations and Quantitative Management, 1(1995)1, pp. 3–13.
 "The Evolution of Optimality: De Novo Programming," in: Evolutionary Multi-Criterion Optimization, edited by C.A. Coello Coello et al., Springer-Verlag, Berlin-Heidelberg, 2005, pp. 1–13.
 “Multiobjective Optimization, Systems Design and De Novo Programming,” in: Handbook of Multicriteria Analysis, edited by. C. Zopounidis and P.M. Pardalos, Springer-Verlag, 2010, pp. 243–262.

Knowledge Management 
 "Management Support Systems: Towards Integrated Knowledge Management," Human Systems Management, 7(1987) 1, pp. 59–70.
 "Knowledge as a New Form of Capital, Part 1: Division and Reintegration of Knowledge," Human Systems Management, 8(1989)1, pp. 45–58. "Part 2: KnowledgeBased Management Systems," 8(1989)2, pp. 129–143.
 "Knowledge As Capital/Capital As Knowledge," Human Systems Management, 9(1990)3, pp. l29-130.
 "Knowledge As Capital: Integrated Quality Management," Prometheus, 9(1991)1, pp. 93–101.
 "Knowledge As Coordination of Action," Human Systems Management, 15(1996)4, pp. 211–213.
 "Knowledge-Information Circulation through the Enterprise: Forward to the Roots of Knowledge Management," in: Data Mining and Knowledge Management, edited by Y. Shi, W. Xu, and Z. Chen, Springer-Verlag, Berlin-Heidelberg, 2004, pp. 22–33.
 Human Systems Management: Integrating Knowledge, Management and Systems, World Scientific, 2005.
 "Knowledge-Information Autopoietic Cycle: Towards the Wisdom Systems,"   Int. J. Management and Decision Making, Vol. 7, No. 1, 2006, pp. 3–18.
 “The Innovation Factory: Management Systems, Knowledge Management and Production of Innovations,“ in: Expanding the Limits of the Possible, edited by P. Walden, R. Fullér, and J. Carlsson, Åbo, November 2006, pp. 163–175.
 “From Knowledge to Wisdom: On Being Informed and Knowledgeable, Becoming Wise and Ethical,” International Journal of Information Technology & Decision Making, 5(2006)4, pp. 751–762.
 “Knowledge Management and the Strategies of Global Business Education: From Knowledge to Wisdom“, in: The Socio-EconomicTransformation: Getting Closer to What? edited by Z. Nahorski, J. W. Owsiński and T. Szapiro, Palgrave Macmillan, Houndmills, 2007, Ch. 7, pp. 101–116.
 “Knowledge Management and Strategic Planning: A Human Systems Perspective,” in: Making Strategies in Spatial Planning: Knowledge and Values, edited by M. Cerreta, G. Concilio and V. Monno, Series: Urban and Landscape Perspectives, Vol. 9, Springer-Verlag, 2010, pp. 257–280.
 “Integrated Knowledge Management,” Int. J. Information Systems and Social Change, 4(2013)4, pp. 54–70.

Technology Management 
 "High Technology Management," Human Systems Management, 3(1982) 2, pp. 57–59.
 "La gestione a tecnologia e la gestione della tecnologia superiore," in: La sfida della complessita, edited by G. Bocchi and M. Ceruti, Feltrinelli, Milano, 1985, pp. 401–413.
 "High Technology Management," Human Systems Management, 6(1986) 2, pp. 109–120.
 "Telework, Telecommuting and Telebusiness," Human Systems Management, 17(1998)4, pp. 223–225.
 IEBM Handbook of Information Technology in Business, Editor, Thomson, London, 2000, p. 870.
 New Frontiers of Decision Making for the Information Technology Era, Editor with Y. Shi, World Scientific Publishers, 2000.
 "Introduction: What Is IT/S?” in: IEBM Handbook of Information Technology in Business, ed. M. Zeleny, Thomson, London, 2000, pp. xv-xvii. Also: "High Technology Management," pp. 56–62. "Global Management Paradigm," pp. 48–55. "Mass Customization," pp. 200–207. "Autopoiesis (Self-Production)," pp. 283–290. "Business Process Reengineering (BPR)," pp. 14–22. "Knowledge vs. Information," pp. 162–168. "Integrated Process Management," pp. 110–118. "Self-Service Society," pp. 240–248. "Telepresence," pp. 821–827. "Kinetic Enterprise & Forecasting," pp. 134–141. "New Economy," pp. 208–217. "Tradeoffs Management," pp. 450–458. "Critical Path Analysis," pp. 308–314. "Decision Making, Multiple Criteria," pp. 315–329. "Optimality and Optimization," pp. 392–409.
 IEBM Handbook of Information Technology in Business, Editor, Paperback edition, Thomson, London, 2001, p. 870.
 "Knowledge of Enterprise: Knowledge Management or Knowledge Technology?" International Journal of Information Technology & Decision Making, 1(2002)2, pp. 181–207.
 “Entering the Era of Networks: Global Supply and Demand Outsourcing Networks and Alliances,” in: Quantitative Methoden der Logistik und des Supply Chain Management, edited by M. Jacquemin, R. Pibornik, and E. Sucky, Verlag Dr. Kovač, Hamburg, 2006, pp. 85–97.
 “The mobile society: effects of global sourcing and network organization”’, Int. J. Mobile Learning and Organization, Vol. 1, No. 1, 2007, pp. 30–40.
 “Strategy and strategic action in the global era: overcoming the knowing-doing Gap”, Int. J. Technology Management, Vol. 43, Nos. 1-3, 2008, pp. 64–75.
 “Technology and High Technology: Support Net and Barriers to Innovation,” Advanced Management Systems, vol. 1, no. 1, 2009, pp. 8–21.
 “Technology and High Technology: Support Net and Barriers to Innovation,” Acta Mechanica Slovaca, vol. 13, no. 1, 2009, pp. 6–19.
 “High Technology and Barriers to Innovation: From Globalization to Localization,” Int. J. Info. Tech. Dec. Mak., 11 (2012) p. 441.

Artificial Life 
 "Osmotic Growths: A Challenge to Systems Science," Int. J. General Systems, 14(1988) 1, pp. 1–17. (With G.J. Klir and K.D. Hufford)
 Interview on Artificial Life, in: "Child of a Lesser God" (E. Regis and T. Dworetzky), Omni, 11(1988) 1, pp. 92–170.
 "Precipitation  Membranes,  Osmotic  Growths, and Synthetic  Biology," in: Artificial Life, edited by C.G. Langton, Santa Fe Institute Studies in the Sciences of Complexity, vol. VI, Addison-Wesley,  Reading, MA, 1989, pp. 125–139. (With G. J. Klir and K.D. Hufford)
 "Synthetic Biology and Osmotic Growths," in: Systems & Control Encyclopedia, Supplementary Volume 1, Pergamon Press, Elmsford, N.Y., 1990, pp. 573–578.

References 

Zeleny, Milan